Amyema arthrocaulis is a species of mistletoe in the family Loranthaceae native to New Guinea.

References

External links
Amyema arthrocaulis occurrence data from GBIF

arthrocaulis
Flora of New Guinea
Parasitic plants
Epiphytes
Taxa named by Bryan Alwyn Barlow